Dennis McCarthy MBE (7 May 1933 – 10 January 1996) was a British radio presenter.

McCarthy was a decorator, washing-machine salesman and dog-breeder before joining BBC Radio Nottingham shortly after it opened in 1968, following an interview about taking part in the Crufts dog show that caught the attention of station bosses.

He broadcast five days a week with Afternoon Special, networked to BBC Radio Leicester, BBC Radio Derby and BBC Radio Lincolnshire in 1980.

The Sunday Show presented with his daughter Tara, now a barrister, attracted one-in-six of the Nottinghamshire population as listeners.

During almost three decades his interviewees included show business figures and politicians, including six Prime Ministers. For BBC Radio 4 he contributed features and interviews. He was a reporter for the BBC on East Midlands TV.

He was made an MBE for services to broadcasting in 1991. He created books linked to his programmes and his love of dogs.

Taken ill on air, McCarthy insisted on finishing the programme, dying the same day at his home in Bingham. As his funeral procession travelled towards Nottingham Cathedral, traffic in the city centre stopped with crowds six deep in places.

Nottingham Express Transit has named a Bombardier Incentro AT6/5 tram Dennis McCarthy MBE.

References

BBC radio presenters
1933 births
1996 deaths
Members of the Order of the British Empire